The 1936–37 season was Aberdeen's 32nd season in the top flight of Scottish football and their 33rd season competed in the Scottish League Division One and the Scottish Cup.

Results

Division One

Final standings

Scottish Cup

References

AFC Heritage Trust

Aberdeen F.C. seasons
Aber